The University of Toronto Chinese Students and Scholars Association (UTCSSA) was established in 1982. It is the oldest and largest Chinese student association in Toronto. As a student association registered in the education office of the Consulate-General of the People’s Republic of China in Toronto, UTCSSA is dedicated to helping Chinese students of the University of Toronto in developing a comfortable environment for learning, working, socializing and entertaining.

In a news report by the Canadian Broadcasting Corporation's flagship news program, The National, the UTCSSA was accused of coordinating online threats against a Tibetan student activist at the university.

See also 

 Chinese Students and Scholars Association

References

University of Toronto
1982 establishments in Ontario